The year 1981 in architecture involved some significant architectural events and new buildings.

Buildings and structures

Buildings

 JPMorgan Chase Tower, Houston, Texas designed by I. M. Pei is completed.
 Sydney Tower in Sydney, Australia is completed and opened.
 Colonius in Cologne, Germany is completed.
 Fifth Avenue Place (Calgary) in Calgary, Alberta.
 Sangath in Ahmedabad, India, a studio designed for himself by B. V. Doshi, is completed.
 The Riyadh TV Tower in Riyadh, Saudi Arabia is completed.
 The National Palace of Culture opens in Sofia, Bulgaria.
 Howell High School in Howell, MI is completed as the most expensive high school at the time in the State of Michigan.
 The Marriott World Trade Center originally known as the Vista Hotel, is completed in Lower Manhattan, New York as a part of the World Trade Center complex.
 The Humber Bridge in England, the longest suspension bridge in the world by the length of central span (1981–1998), designed by Freeman Fox & Partners (consulting engineers) and R. E. Slater (architect) is opened to traffic.

Awards
AIA Gold Medal – Josep Lluís Sert.
Architecture Firm Award – Hardy Holzman Pfeiffer Associates.
Grand prix national de l'architecture – Gérard Thurnauer, Pierre Riboulet and Jean-Louis Veret.
Pritzker Prize – James Stirling.
RAIA Gold Medal – Colin Madigan.
RIBA Royal Gold Medal – Philip Dowson.
Twenty-five Year Award – Farnsworth House.

Births

Deaths
 March 7 – Roy Grounds (born 1905)
 April 10 – Charles Cowles-Voysey (born 1889)
 July 1 – Marcel Breuer (born 1902)
 September 1 – Albert Speer (born 1905)
 December 2 – Wallace Harrison (born 1895)

 
20th-century architecture